The London County Board of the Gaelic Athletic Association (GAA) or London GAA is one of the county boards outside Ireland, and is responsible for Gaelic games in London. The county board is also responsible for the London county teams and schools.

The county football team compete in the All-Ireland Senior Football Championship on an annual basis, the only English based team to do so. They participate through in the Connacht Senior Football Championship as the Irish community in London are considered as part of the province of Connacht.

The county hurling team competed in the All-Ireland Senior Hurling Championship, but having been relegated during the preliminary group stage of the Leinster Championship in the 2014 season, the team currently plays in the third tier Christy Ring Cup.

Overview
London played in three hurling and five football All Ireland finals in the early 1900s when the All-Ireland and All-Britain champions were paired in the final. London won the hurling All-Ireland in 1901, defeating Cork by 1-5 to 0-4. The experiment was abandoned after 1908. Tim Doody, a native of Tournafulla Co Limerick, played in both All Ireland Finals, with London, on the same day in 1901, a record unlikely to be broken anytime soon. The early London teams of that era drew strongly on immigrants from the Cork area in particular. Sam Maguire, who captained many of the teams, came from Dunmanway. The GAA later named the All-Ireland Football Championship's trophy in his honour.

London played the first ever recorded composite rules shinty–hurling match with London Camanachd in 1896.

Clubs
 Brothers Pearse
 Cu Chulainns
 Dulwich Harps
 Eire Og
 Fr. Murphy's
 Fulham Irish
 Garryowen
 Granuaile
 Harlesden Harps
 Kilburn Gaels
 Kingdom Kerry Gaels
 Neasden Gaels
 North London Shamrocks
 Parnells
 Robert Emmets
 Round Towers
 St. Anthony's
 St. Brendan's
 St. Claret's
 St. Gabriel's
 St. Joseph's
 St. Kiernan's
 Seán Treacy's
 Tara
 Thomas McCurtains
 Tir Chonaill Gaels
 Wandsworth Gaels

Football

Clubs

Clubs contest the London Senior Football Championship.

County team

London entered the National Football League in 1993 and were initially fairly successful with 2 wins, 2 draws and 2 losses in their first campaign and the renewed effort coincided with a drive to establish the games in schools. London now fields its second team in the British Junior football and hurling Championships. Their first football team have competed in the Connacht Senior Football Championship since 1975, but in the first 37 years of competing could only manage one win: a 0-9 to 0-6 defeat of Leitrim in 1977.

After going down by 9-19 to 1-10 against Roscommon in 1980 they staged matches at home in Ruislip and came close to victory against Leitrim in 1987, Sligo in 1988 and Roscommon in 2005. Among their footballers was Brian Grealish, whose brother Tony played association football for the Republic of Ireland. Due to the Foot and Mouth crisis in England, London withdrew from the 2001 Connacht Senior Football Championship; their first round championship fixture against Mayo was cancelled until the 2006 fixture between the teams. In June 2011, London were defeated in extra-time against Mayo in the Connacht Championship, London entered the first qualifying round and defeated Fermanagh by 0-15 to 0-9 in Ruislip in the first round of the qualifiers, recording their first championship win for 34 years. London were drawn against Waterford for their second qualifying round match.

In 2013, the GAA banned London from travelling to Ireland for warm-up games, as a result of a GAA rule put in place to prevent teams travelling abroad for training camps in the run up to the championship, putting them at a major disadvantage to other counties. On 26 May 2013, London defeated Sligo by a scoreline of 1-12 to 0-14 to gain their first victory in the Connacht Championship since 1977. Lorcan Mulvey scored the vital London goal. The day after they defeated Sligo was a bank holiday in England so the players rested. London held Leitrim in the Connacht semi-final then won the replay. After these three games they headed for the Connacht final - their first appearance at that level - but lost to Mayo. They arrived in Ireland for the final on a specially charted jet. Thus they entered Round 4 of the Qualifiers for the All-Ireland Series - also their first time to feature there. They drew Cavan, their first Championship meeting with them and the game was set for Croke Park, another historic occasion for London. Cavan won by a score of 1-17 to 1-08 to proceed to the All-Ireland quarter-finals. Lorcan Mulvey was later nominated for an All Star, but was not selected.

In 2018, London fielded a record six London-born starters in their championship line-up in their defeat to Sligo in the Connacht Senior Football Championship, with a further two on the bench.

Hurling

Clubs

Clubs contest the London Senior Hurling Championship.

County team

London has a strong hurling tradition. It claims consistently good results in the National Hurling League. As a mid-table Division 2 side, London is actually placed above half the counties of Ireland, in strong contrast to the county's role as whipping boys in the other Gaelic sport of football (see London's record in football).

The county won the 1901 All-Ireland Senior Hurling Championship (SHC). In the 1973 All-Ireland SHC, a London team that included six Galwaymen defeated Galway by a scoreline of 4–7 to 3–5 in the All-Ireland SHC quarter-final at Ballinasloe. Galwaymen Frank Canning and Lennie Burke scored three of the goals against their old county.

London won five All-Ireland B Championships between 1985 and 1995.

London won the inaugural Nicky Rackard Cup in 2005, defeating Louth's hurlers by 15 points in the final. London won the 2011 Nicky Rackard Cup, defeating Louth in the final. London won the 2012 Christy Ring Cup, defeating Wicklow by a scoreline of 4–18 to 1–17. This gained the county promotion to the 2013 All-Ireland SHC. In the 2014 All-Ireland SHC, London finished bottom of the preliminary group after being beaten by Westmeath in the final game of the round robin stage in Mullingar, and the county was relegated back to the Christy Ring Cup for the 2015 season.

Ladies' football

History
Ladies' football in London has mirrored the growth seen in Ireland, where it is the fastest growing ladies' game. In London Parnells were senior champions and Fulham Irish were Junior champions for 2010. Many clubs now have ladies' teams. Senior teams are Thomas McCurtains GAA, Parnells, Kerry Kingdom Gaels, Fr Murphys, Holloway Gaels and Taras. Junior teams in London 2010 were Fulham Irish, Clonbony, Taras (Junior), Claddagh Gaels (Luton) and Dulwich Harps. In 2011, St Anthonys (Reading) joined the Junior ranks.

London have the following achievements in ladies' football.

All-Ireland Junior Ladies' Football Championship 2
1993, 2008
All-Ireland Junior Ladies' Football Championship Finalists: 1
2007

References

External links

 Official website
 In pics: London celebrate their historic victory over Sligo

 
British GAA
Gaelic games governing bodies in the United Kingdom